Redigo may refer to:

 Redigo (TV series), a 1963 Western dramatic series
 Aermacchi M-290 RediGO, a 1985–1995 Finnish-Italian turboprop-powered military basic trainer and liaison aircraft
 Datsun redi-GO, a 2016–present Japanese-Indian city car